Notable alumni of Missouri State University. Most of these students attended under the former names of the school: Fourth District Normal School (1905–1919), Southwest Missouri State Teacher's College (1919–1972), and Southwest Missouri State University (1972–2005).

Athletes
 Blake Ahearn, current NBA G-League head coach, former NBA D-League player, played in 15 NBA Games
 David Arkin, former NFL player
 Scott Bailes, former MLB player
 Mark Bailey, former MLB player
 Buddy Baumann, former MLB player
 Scott Carroll, former MLB player
 Dylan Cole, current NFL player
 Zak Cummings, professional mixed martial artist for the Ultimate Fighting Championship
 Ross Detwiler, current MLB player
 Winston Garland, former NBA player
 Matt Hall, current MLB player
 Clay Harbor, current NFL player and The Bachelorette contestant
 Jason Hart, former MLB player
 Kyle Hiebert, Current MLS player
 Ryan Howard, former MLB player
 Alize Johnson, current NBA player
 Pierce Johnson, current MLB player
 Mike Kickham, former MLB player
 Jerry Lumpe, former MLB player
 Shaun Marcum, former MLB player
 Bill Mueller, former MLB player
 Matt Palmer, former MLB player
 Lance Parker, former MLS player
 Curtis Perry, former NBA player
 Matt Pickens, current MLS player
 John Rheinecker, former MLB player
 Norm Siebern, former MLB player
 Brett Sinkbeil, former MLB player
 Horton Smith, first Masters Tournament winner
 Brad St. Louis, former  NFL player
 Jamal Sutton  ,former MLS player
 Jackie Stiles, former WNBA player, NCAA All-Time Leading Scorer
 Luke Voit, current MLB player
 Jason Whittle, former NFL player
 Brad Ziegler, former MLB player

Business people
 David Glass, former Wal-Mart CEO, former Kansas City Royals owner

Entertainers
 Jim Bohannon, radio talk show host, Westwood One
 Kevin Brockmeier, author
 Don S. Davis, actor
 John Goodman, actor 
 Tess Harper, actor
 Kendra Kassebaum, Broadway actor, singer
 Kyle Dean Massey, actor
 Crystal Methyd, drag queen and runner-up of RuPaul's Drag Race (season 12)
 Kathleen Turner, actor (transferred to University of Maryland, Baltimore County)

Art and media
 Julie Blackmon, photographer
 Bessie Breuer, journalist, novelist, writer, and playwright
 Theodore Melfi, director and screenwriter for Hidden Figures

Public officials
 Roy Blunt, former Minority Whip of the United States House of Representatives; former U.S. Senator
 Eric Burlison, Republican member of the Missouri Senate
 Donald Dedmon, fourth president of Radford University and ninth (acting) president of Marshall University
 Lacey Eastburn, tenth president of Northern Arizona University
 Bob Holden, former governor of Missouri
 Lincoln Hough, Republican member of the Missouri Senate
 Margaret B. Kelly, former Missouri State Auditor
Carrie Tergin, current Jefferson City mayor
 Todd Tiahrt, former U.S. Congressman from Kansas's 4th congressional district and current Republican National Committeeman from Kansas
Austin Petersen, former 2016 presidential candidate for the Libertarian Party nomination

Military
 Frank J. Grass, United States Army General and Chief of the National Guard Bureau

Engineers 
 Geraldine Holm Hoch, engineer at Lockheed Martin and Northrop Grumman

Scientists 

 Dorothy Martin Simon, physical chemist

References

 
Missouri State University alumni